The 2024 Indian general election in Bihar will be held in or before May 2024 to elect the 40 members of 18th Lok Sabha.

Parties and alliances





Others

References

Indian general elections in Assam